Mafika Pascal Gwala (5 October 1946 – 5 September 2014) was a contemporary South African poet and editor, writing in English and Zulu.

Early life and education
Mafika Gwala was born and grew up in Verulam, north of Durban, KwaZulu-Natal. He completed an M.Phil. in Politics from the University of Natal and was a researcher at Manchester University.

Work and activism
Gwala spent most of his adult life in Mpumalanga Township, west of Durban. He worked in a factory as a clerk, an industrial relations officer, a high school teacher, and a guest university lecturer, aside from writing and editing.

Gwala was active in the struggle against apartheid and a leading light of the 1970s Black Consciousness movement, of which he says:

Writing
In 1982, Gwala published a book of Black Consciousness poetry in a collection called No More Lullabies. His work is characterised by a rhythmic musicality he attributes to the Zulu language. In 1991, he edited and translated into English a collection of Zulu writing entitled Musho! Zulu Popular Praises.

Works
Poetry
Jol'iinkomo (1977)
No More Lullabies (1982)

Edited
Black Review (1973)
Musho! Zulu Popular Praises, with Liz Gunner (Michigan State University, 1991)

External links
The jive poem
Interview at Chimurenga Online
Interview & poem at Mail & Guardian Online

References

1946 births
Living people
People from KwaZulu-Natal
Zulu people
20th-century South African poets
South African male poets
20th-century South African male writers
Zulu-language poets